Basia is a village in the Basia CD block in the Basia subdivision of the Gumla district in the Indian state of Jharkhand.

Geography

Location                           
Basia is located at 

Basia is situated about 24 kms. north of Kolebira in Simdega district.

Area overview 
The map alongside presents a rugged area, consisting partly of flat-topped hills called pat and partly of an undulating plateau, in the south-western portion of Chota Nagpur Plateau. Three major rivers – the Sankh, South Koel and North Karo - along with their numerous tributaries, drain the area. The hilly area has large deposits of Bauxite. 93.7% of the population lives in rural areas.

Note: The map alongside presents some of the notable locations in the district. All places marked in the map are linked in the larger full screen map.

Civic administration  
There is a police station at Basia. 
 
The headquarters of Basia CD block are located at Basia village.

Demographics 
According to the 2011 Census of India, Basia had a total population of 3,985, of which 1,979 (50%) were males and 2,006 (50%) were females. Population in the age range 0–6 years was 579. The total number of literate persons in Basia was 2,549 (74.84% of the population over 6 years).

(*For language details see Basia block#Language and religion)

Education
Rajkriyakrit High School Basia is a Hindi-medium coeducational institution established in 1952. It has facilities for teaching from class VIII to class XII. The school has a playground and a library with 880 books.

Basia Inter College is a Hindi-medium coeducational institution established in 1985. It has facilities for teaching in classes XI and XII. It has a playground, a library with 400 books and has 3 computers for teaching and learning purposes.

Kasturba Gandhi Balika Vidyalaya is a Hindi-medium girls only institution established in 2007. It has facilities for teaching from class VI to class XII. The school has a playground, a library with 610 books and has 5 computers for learning and teaching purposes.

References 

Villages in Gumla district